Brachmia ditemenitis is a moth in the family Gelechiidae. It was described by Edward Meyrick in 1934. It is found in Equatorial Guinea.

References

Moths described in 1934
Brachmia
Taxa named by Edward Meyrick
Moths of Africa